Anthony "Tony" O'Doherty (born 23 April 1947) is a Northern Irish former footballer and football manager.

A native of Creggan, Derry, O'Doherty played for Coleraine FC, Derry City FC, Finn Harps, Dundalk FC and briefly for Ballymena United and also internationally for Northern Ireland in the British Home Championship against England in front of a crowd of 100,000 at the old Wembley Stadium on 21 April 1970. In total, he won two international caps.

From 1993-94, O'Doherty managed his old club, Derry City.

Other
According to Eamonn McCann, O'Doherty headed the Free Derry Police for a time in the early 1970s.

O'Doherty now writes an opinion-based column, the "Doc's Prescription", in the sports section one of the Derry Journal.

Honours

  Blaxnit Cup
 Coleraine F.C. 1969

 FAI Cup 
 Finn Harps 1974
 Dundalk 1981

References

External links

1946 births
Living people
Association footballers from Northern Ireland
League of Ireland players
League of Ireland managers
Derry City F.C. managers
Derry City F.C. players
NIFL Premiership players
Coleraine F.C. players
Northern Ireland international footballers
Finn Harps F.C. players
Ballymena United F.C. players
Association football midfielders
Football managers from Northern Ireland